David Dor Micha (or Miha, ; born 2 March 1992) is an Israeli professional footballer who plays as an attacking midfielder for Israeli Premier League club Hapoel Be'er Sheva and the Israel national team.

Early and personal life
Micha was born in Givatayim, Israel, to a family of both Sephardi Jewish and Mizrahi Jewish (Iraqi-Jewish) descent. His father Kobi Micha is a former Israeli footballer who also played for Maccabi Tel Aviv, although he retired at the age of 26 due to a knee injury. Micha attended the Kalai High School in his hometown.

He also holds a Portuguese passport, on account of both his Sephardi Jewish and Mizrahi Jewish (Iraqi-Jewish) ancestry, which eases the move to certain European football leagues.

He was in a relationship with Israeli actress Nuel Berkovich from 2013 to 2020. He married his Israeli girlfriend Almog ( BarNoy) in 2021, and they have a daughter who was born in 2022.

Club career
Micha joined Maccabi Tel Aviv when he was 8 years old. On 2004 he started playing with the youth team and was tagged as a potential talent since he joined. Former international player Eli Ohana, his manager in the Israel U-19 national team, described him in an interview in August 2011 as "the most talented player I have ever managed".

On 12 February 2011, after the arrival of Moti Ivanir as the new manager of Maccabi and as a rejuvenation period led by the club, Micha made his debut for the club against Hapoel Ramat Gan in a match Maccabi Tel Aviv won at the score 3–0. He scored the third goal and assisted another one in that game. On 29 September 2011, he scored his first goal in a European competition, leading his team to a 1–1 draw after a stunning shot against Dynamo Kyiv in Bloomfield Stadium on the UEFA Europa League group stage.

In the 2012–2013 season Micha was a key player in Maccabi Tel Aviv's success in retaining the championship, playing 28 games and scoring five goals, and mostly excelled during the latter stages of the season after scoring in both derby matches against Hapoel Tel Aviv in the playoffs.

In the 2013–14 season Micha continued his good run from the end of the last season by scoring a crucial away goal against Bordeaux in the Europa League group stage, which obtained Maccabi its first ever win in the competitions group stage.

International career
On 5 September 2011, Micha made his international youth debut with the Israel U-21 team against England. The decision to not include him in the squad for the UEFA European Under-21 Championship in 2013 was controversial. Micha was a central figure in the team during the 2015 European Under-21 Championship qualifications which Israel finished second and was supposed to qualify but did not since only the best four teams who finished second in the groups qualified.

Micha was called-up to the senior Israeli squad for a friendly match against Serbia in May 2016.

Career statistics

Club

Honours 

Maccabi Tel Aviv
 Israeli Premier League: 2012–13, 2013–14, 2014–15, 2018–19
 Israel State Cup: 2014–15
 Israel Toto Cup (Ligat Ha'al): 2014–15, 2017–18, 2018–19
 Israel Super Cup: 2019

Anorthosis Famagusta
 Cypriot Cup: 2020–21

Hapoel Be'er Sheva
 Israel State Cup: 2021–22
 Israel Super Cup: 2022

Individual
 Israeli Premier League Most Assists: 2016–17, 2018–19
 Israeli Footballer of the Year: 2018–19

See also 
 List of Jewish footballers
 List of Jews in sports
 List of Israelis

References

External links 
 
 
 
 

1992 births
Living people
Israeli Jews
Jewish footballers
Israeli footballers
Association football midfielders
Israel international footballers
Israel youth international footballers
Israel under-21 international footballers
Maccabi Tel Aviv F.C. players
Anorthosis Famagusta F.C. players
Hapoel Be'er Sheva F.C. players
Israeli Premier League players
Cypriot First Division players
Israeli people of Iraqi-Jewish descent
Footballers from Givatayim
Israeli expatriate footballers
Expatriate footballers in Cyprus
Israeli expatriate sportspeople in Cyprus
Sephardi Jews
Mizrahi Jews
Israeli Footballer of the Year recipients